Zero Contact is a 2021 American thriller film directed by Rick Dugdale and starring Anthony Hopkins. It was the first feature film to be released via Vuele, a non-fungible token platform.

Zero Contact was released internationally on September 24, 2021, and was released in the United States on May 27, 2022, by Lionsgate.

Cast
 Anthony Hopkins as Finley Hart
 Chris Brochu as Sam Hart
 Veronica Ferres as Veronica Schultz 
 Aleks Paunovic as Trevor Williams 
 Lilly Krug as Jamie Schultz 
 TJ Kayama as Riku Matsuda 
 Martin Stenmarck as Hakan Nordquist 
 James C. Burns as Doug Mancini
 David beatty as William 
 Angella Kostic as Katherine Hart
 Tova Novotny as Host
 Rukiya Bernard as Taylor Williams
 Osman Aboubakr as Omar
 Adrian Holmes as Phil
 Linda Darlow as Rebecca 
 Marcus West as Opposing Council

Production
In May 2020, it was announced Enderby Entertainment would commence production on a thriller titled 92. The film was shot in 17 countries. It was filmed entirely virtually via Zoom and during the 2020 COVID-19 pandemic. In September 2021, the film's first official trailer officially revealed production details including: Peter Toumasis and Cam Cannon, served as producers alongside Dugdale; Edd Lukas served as cinematographer; and Håkan Karlsson served as editor. It also stated that People in the Park Productions is credited in post-production.

Release
The film was released as an NFT via CurrencyWorks Inc.'s platform Vuele.

In January 2022, it was announced that Lions Gate Entertainment had acquired distribution rights via its subsidiary Grindstone Entertainment, with a scheduled release date in May 2022. Zero Contact was released on May 27, 2022.

Marketing
The first trailer was released online, in September 2021. It notably announced many of the production details on-screen. In May 2021, following Lionsgate's purchase of distribution rights, a new poster and trailer was released alongside the official announcement of the movie's official release date.

Reception
The film has a 10% rating on Rotten Tomatoes based on 10 reviews.

Rich Cross of Starburst gave the film a positive review and wrote, "High-concept techno-thriller Zero Contact is the latest mainstream movie determined to make a virtue out of the necessity of the Covid lockdown." Frank Scheck of The Hollywood Reporter gave the film a negative review and wrote, "Let’s just say that 'The machine runs on dark matter reactor' is one of the script’s more coherent lines." Dennis Harvey of Variety gave the film a negative review, calling it "a steaming pile of nada."

Future
In January 2022, it was announced that two sequels will be filmed back-to-back. Anthony Hopkins will reprise his role from the first movie, which was filmed remotely via Zoom. Director Rick Dugdale revealed that principal photography had already commenced, with the projects in various degrees of production. The collaborative development with Lionsgate is noted as being the first feature film to be produced on-location in Antarctica. The production crew worked alongside Sebastian Copeland and David Hatcher Childress to ensure safety in the extreme conditions of the frozen Tundra continent. The production will also take place in 14 other geographical locations.

References

External links
 

American thriller films
2021 thriller films
2020s English-language films
2021 directorial debut films
2020s American films